Pablo Manuel Galdames Díaz (born 26 June 1974 in Santiago de Chile) is a Chilean former professional footballer who played as a midfielder. He obtained a total number of 22 caps for the Chile national team, scoring two goals between 1995 and 2001.

At the club level, Galdames played for Unión Española and Universidad de Chile in his home country, Cruz Azul and CD Veracruz in Mexico, Colombian side América de Cali, as well as Racing Club, Quilmes AC and Instituto Atlético Central Córdoba from Argentina.

Personal life
He is the father of the Chilean footballers Pablo Jr. and Thomas and of the Mexican-Chilean footballer Benjamín. He is also the father of Mathías Galdames, who is the half-brother of Pablo Jr., Thomas and Benjamín.

Political views
He is member of the Independent Regionalist Party (PRI) and in 2017 he supported the presidential candidacy of Sebastián Piñera. Likewise, he was candidate for a seat in the Chamber of Deputies representing the 8th district.

Notes

Honours

Club
Unión Española
 Copa Chile (1): 1993

Universidad de Chile
 Primera División de Chile (2): 1999, 2000
 Copa Chile (2): 1998, 2000

References

External Links

Pablo Galdames at PartidosdeLaRoja 

1974 births
Living people
Footballers from Santiago
Chilean footballers
Chilean expatriate footballers
Chile international footballers
1995 Copa América players
2001 Copa América players
Unión Española footballers
Universidad de Chile footballers
Cruz Azul footballers
C.D. Veracruz footballers
Racing Club de Avellaneda footballers
Quilmes Atlético Club footballers
América de Cali footballers
Instituto footballers
Chilean Primera División players
Liga MX players
Argentine Primera División players
Categoría Primera A players
Primera Nacional players
Chilean expatriate sportspeople in Mexico
Chilean expatriate sportspeople in Argentina
Chilean expatriate sportspeople in Colombia
Expatriate footballers in Mexico
Expatriate footballers in Argentina
Expatriate footballers in Colombia
Association football midfielders
Chilean politicians
Politicians from Santiago
Chilean sportsperson-politicians
Independent Regionalist Party politicians